is a Japanese judoka.

He participated at the 2018 World Judo Championships, winning a silver medal.

He won the gold medal in his event at the 2022 Judo Grand Slam Paris held in Paris, France.

References

External links
 

1998 births
Living people
Japanese male judoka
Sportspeople from Hyōgo Prefecture
Universiade gold medalists for Japan
Universiade medalists in judo
Medalists at the 2017 Summer Universiade
20th-century Japanese people
21st-century Japanese people